Jessica Phoenix (born October 16, 1983 in Uxbridge, Ontario) is a Canadian Equestrian Team athlete in eventing.

Career
Phoenix won a gold medal in the individual eventing competition at the 2011 Pan American Games in Guadalajara. She also won a silver medal as part of the team eventing competition.

Phoenix made her Olympic debut at the 2012 Olympic Games in London, finishing 22nd in individual eventing.

Phoenix competed at her third Pan American Games in 2015. Once again she returned home with two medals, an individual silver and a team bronze. She rode a Westphalian gelding Pavarotti.

In July 2016, she was named to Canada's Olympic team. At the Games held in Rio de Janeiro, Brazil, Phoenix placed 10th in the team competition and finished 38th individually, collecting 131.60 penalties across the three stages with A Little Romance.

CCI***** results

International championship results

Honours 
In 2012 Phoenix was awarded the Queen Elizabeth II Diamond Jubilee Medal.

References

External links
Personal website

1983 births
Canadian female equestrians
Living people
Sportspeople from Ontario
People from Uxbridge, Ontario
Equestrians at the 2012 Summer Olympics
Equestrians at the 2016 Summer Olympics
Olympic equestrians of Canada
Equestrians at the 2007 Pan American Games
Equestrians at the 2011 Pan American Games
Equestrians at the 2015 Pan American Games
Equestrians at the 2019 Pan American Games
Pan American Games gold medalists for Canada
Pan American Games silver medalists for Canada
Pan American Games bronze medalists for Canada
Pan American Games medalists in equestrian
Medalists at the 2011 Pan American Games
Medalists at the 2015 Pan American Games
Medalists at the 2019 Pan American Games
20th-century Canadian women
21st-century Canadian women